Clube de Regatas do Flamengo is a multisport club based in Rio de Janeiro, Brazil. It was founded in 1895 and is one of the most popular clubs in Brazil.

List of presidents
Below is the official presidential history of Clube de Regatas do Flamengo.

The club had dozens of presidents, with variable permanence time. From 1895 to 1932, the terms lasted one year, from 1933 to 1956 two years, from 1957 to 1968 three years, from 1969 to 2000 was again two years and starting from 2001 again three years.

References

External links
Official website

Presidents